Gymnopilus sapineus, commonly known as the scaly rustgill, is a small and widely distributed mushroom which grows in dense clusters on dead conifer wood.  It has a rusty orange spore print and a bitter taste. This species does not stain blue and lacks the hallucinogen psilocybin.

Taxonomy

Speciation in Gymnopilus is not clearly defined. This is further complicated by the macroscopic morphological and ecological similarities between members of the G. sapineus complex such as G. penetrans and G. nevadensis. Michael Kuo explicates upon this by speaking of the arbitrary distinction made between G. sapineus and G. penetrans made by Elias Magnus Fries. He at first labeled G. penetrans to merely be a form of G. sapineus in 1815, but then recanted and labeled them separate in 1821.

Description

This mushroom is often mistaken for G. luteocarneus which grows on conifers and has a smoother and darker cap.  Another lookalike is G. penetrans which grows in the same habitat and has minor microscopic differences.

The cap margin is inrolled at first and curves outward as it matures, becoming almost plane and sometimes developing fibrillose cracks in age. The flesh is yellow to orange and delicate when compared to larger and firmer members of Gymnopilus, such as G. junonius.

Gills: The gills are crowded, yellow at first, turning rusty orange as the spores mature, with adnate attachment.

Microscopic features: Gymnopilus sapineus spores are rusty orange to rusty brown, elliptical, rough, and 7–10 x 4–6 μm.

It has either an equal structure, or becomes thinner near the base. It is light yellow, bruising rusty brown. The stipe has an evanescent veil which often leaves fragments on the upper part of the stipe or the margin of young caps.

Taste and odor: G. sapineus sometimes tastes bitter, and it has a mild, fungoid or sweet smell.

Toxicity: The species is nonpoisonous, but considered inedible.

Similar species 
Similar species include G. aeruginosus, G. luteofolius, G. penetrans, and G. hybridus.

See also

List of Gymnopilus species

References

Further reading 
 Hesler, L. R. (1969). North American species of Gymnopilus. New York: Hafner. p. 117.

External links
 Fungi of California - Gymnopilus sapineus
 Mushroom Observer - Gymnopilus sapineus

sapineus

Taxa named by Elias Magnus Fries
Fungi described in 1815
Fungi of North America